John David Baker (born April 22, 1977) is a former American football punter in the National Football League. He was signed by the St. Louis Rams as an undrafted free agent in 2000. He played college football at North Texas.

Baker was the punter for the Rams during Super Bowl XXXVI.

References

1977 births
Living people
American football punters
Blinn Buccaneers football players
North Texas Mean Green football players
Indianapolis Colts players
St. Louis Rams players
People from Brenham, Texas
Sportspeople from Beaumont, Texas
Players of American football from Texas